The 1990 FDGB-Pokal Final decided the winner of the 1989–90 FDGB-Pokal, the 39th season of East Germany's premier knockout football cup competition. It was played on 2 June 1990 at the Friedrich-Ludwig-Jahn-Sportpark in East Berlin. Dynamo Dresden won the match 2–1 against PSV Schwerin for their 5th title.

Route to the final
The FDGB-Pokal began with 64 teams in a single-elimination knockout cup competition. There were a total of five rounds leading up to the final. Teams were drawn against each other, and the winner after 90 minutes would advance. If still tied, extra time, and if necessary penalties were used to determine the winner.

Note: In all results below, the score of the finalist is given first (H: home; A: away).

Match

Details

References

Dynamo Dresden matches
FC Mecklenburg Schwerin matches
Fdgb-Pokal Final
1990
June 1990 sports events in Europe
1990 in Berlin
Football competitions in Berlin